Surrey Street Market (also known as Croydon Market) is a street market located in Surrey Street, Croydon, south London. Records of a market on the site date back to the 13th century.

It operates six days a week, Monday to Saturday, and mainly sells fruit and vegetables.

History
A market may have existed in Croydon as early as the Anglo-Saxon period, but the earliest certain record is from 1236–7, when an isolated account roll refers to stallage fees. A market charter was granted to the town by Robert Kilwardby, Archbishop of Canterbury, in 1276; and further charters were granted in 1314 by Archbishop Walter Reynolds, and (probably) in c.1343 by Archbishop John de Stratford.

The medieval marketplace, perhaps laid out in 1276, occupied the triangle of land now defined by the High Street, Surrey Street, and Crown Hill. To take advantage of the slope of the ground, it seems that the higher and well-drained east side came to be used for corn-trading, and the lower-lying west side (Butcher Row, now Surrey Street) for trading in livestock, meat, and hides. By the later Middle Ages, however, the open marketplace was becoming infilled with buildings. A building on the east side was bought for use as a market house (mainly for corn-trading) in 1566, and was succeeded by another cornmarket nearby in 1609. The older market house was probably taken over as a general provisions market, and was rebuilt for that purpose (as the so-called Butter Market) in 1708. It continued to be used until 1874.  The street included an inn called The Bell which was later rebuilt as the Dog & Bull in the 18th century.  This had a yard with a well and watering troughs  which was used as a pound for stray animals and cattle.

The charter of 1276 had authorised a weekly market to be held on Wednesdays; that of 1314 a weekly market on Thursdays (probably superseding the Wednesday market); and that of c.1343 a weekly market on Saturdays. The earliest mention of markets actually being held on Saturday dates from 1595, and market day remained Saturday until the middle of the 19th century. In 1861, however, the cornmarket was moved to Thursday, and was held on that day until corn-trading ended in 1907. A minority of traders, mistrusting the change, continued to hold a rival Saturday cornmarket until 1892. The general provisions market continued to be held officially on Saturdays until 1874, when the Butter Market building closed; and afterwards as an unofficial Saturday street market.

Although much of the old marketplace triangle was built up by the 19th century, a small open space remained in Market Street, immediately behind the Butter Market building, and this became the main focus of street trading. However, in 1893 the entire triangle (by this date known as Middle Row) was comprehensively cleared and redeveloped by Croydon Corporation. This development pushed all street trading activities into Surrey Street.

In 1922, the street market was taken over by Croydon Corporation, and relaunched as a 6-day market (Monday to Saturday), which it remains. Saturday continues to be the busiest trading day.

In November 1994 the market received a royal visit from H.R.H. Charles, Prince of Wales.

Present day

Surrey Street is located behind the Grants of Croydon entertainment complex. The market stretches the whole length of the road. In 2013 there were 75 stalls in the street, as well as shops including Iceland and KFC. The market is regularly used as a location for television, film and advertising. Since 1997 Croydon Council has run an annual "Good Stall Award" to encourage stallholders to maintain good trading practices.

See also 
St George's Walk
North End, Croydon

References

Further reading

External links 

Croydon Council Markets site

Streets in the London Borough of Croydon
Retail markets in London
Shopping in the London Borough of Croydon
History of the London Borough of Croydon